The 2010 Northern Illinois Huskies football team represented Northern Illinois University as a member of the West Division of the Mid-American Conference (MAC) during the 2010 NCAA Division I FBS football season. The Huskies compiled an overall record of 11–3 with a mark of 8–0 in conference play, winning the MAC's West Division title. The team advanced to the MAC Championship, where the lost the Miami RedHawks. Northern Illinois was invited to the Humanitarian Bowl, where they defeated Fresno State. The Huskies were led by third-year head coach Jerry Kill during the regular season and for the MAC title game before KIll resigned to become the head football coach at the University of Minnesota. Tom Matukewicz was appointed interim head coach for the bowl game. The team played home games at Huskie Stadium in DeKalb, Illinois.

The season was the third consecutive in which Northern Illinois played in a bowl game. The team's victory in the Humanitarian Bowl was first bowl game win for the Huskies since the 2004 Silicon Valley Football Classic.

Preseason
NIU was considered the favorite in the Pre-season Poll to win the West Division for the MAC.

Recruiting

 Recruited Jasmin Hopkins from Fort Scott Community College where he rushed for 1,931 yards on 300 carries and recorded 18 touchdowns in his Sophomore campaign.

Notable returning players
 #28 (Sr.) Running back Chad Spann First-team all MAC in 2009 (T-5 in NCAA with 19 touchdowns in 2009)
 #54 (Sr.) Defensive end Jake Coffman Second-team all MAC in 2009
 #20 (So.) Defensive back Tommy Davis Third-team all MAC in 2009 as a return specialist

Schedule

Rankings

Game summaries

Iowa State

Despite being without the services of starting quarterback Chandler Harnish, the Huskies pulled within a touchdown midway through the fourth quarter on a one-yard touchdown run by backup signal caller DeMarcus Grady. But an Iowa State touchdown drive immediately thereafter put the game away for the Cyclones.

North Dakota

Hours after the 23–17 win against North Dakota, head coach Jerry Kill was hospitalized for dehydration. He was released and returned to coach the Huskies against Illinois the following week.

Illinois

The Huskie defense was scorched on the ground, allowing 319 rushing yards to the Fighting Illini, and NIU star tailback Chad Spann was held to only 15 yards on 13 carries. Harnish had a strong performance, but lost a fumble in Illinois territory in the fourth quarter that proved to be costly. Punter Josh Wilber was named the MAC West Division Special Teams Player of the Week. He averaged 49.0 yards on five punts, with three punts over 50 yards.

Minnesota

The win was the third over a Big Ten school in the history of the program, and the second in as many years. Spann was named MAC West Division Offensive Player of the Week and Walter Camp Football Foundation Player of the Week. He rushed for 223 yards and two touchdowns on 15 carries.

Akron

Harnish was named MAC West Division Offensive Player of the Week. He completed 16 of 20 passes for 281 yards and three touchdowns in three quarters of action while leading the Huskies to a 50–14 victory at Akron.

Temple

In a matchup of preseason MAC favorites, the Huskies took over in the second half thanks in large part to a dominant and balanced offensive performance that wore the Owls down on a warm day in DeKalb.

Harnish was named MAC West Division Offensive Player of the Week. Harnish accounted for 282 yards of total offense with 211 yards passing and 71 rushing in NIU's 31–17 victory over Temple.

Buffalo

Safety Jimmie Ward was named MAC West Division Special Teams Player of the Week. The freshman from Mobile, Alabama recorded his second blocked punt of the season in a 45–14 win over Buffalo.

Central Michigan

Northern Illinois continued its second-half dominance against MAC foes, not allowing a point after halftime for the third straight week. Linebacker Tyrone Clark was named Mid-American Conference West Division Defensive Player of the Week. Clark picked off two passes in the Huskies' 33–7 win over Central Michigan. His two interceptions both came in the second quarter off of tipped balls.

Western Michigan

Harnish found Willie Clark with a 21-yard TD pass with 3:42 to play to lift the Huskies to their six straight victory, their longest winning streak since 2004. Defensive end Jake Coffman was named MAC West Division Defensive Player of the Week. Coffman came down with a win-clinching interception during the Huskies' 28–21 victory at Western Michigan. Coffman also had four tackles, 1.5 tackles for loss and half a sack.

Toledo

Toledo could not hold on against Northern Illinois's offense as the Huskies dominated the Rockets with Spann scoring three touchdowns and Harnish going 11-of-16 for 162 yards. Harnish was named MAC West Division Offensive Player of the Week for the third time this season. He went 11-of-16 for 162 yards and rushed for 149 yards as well as scoring a touchdown on a 28-yard run.

Ball State

While winning their eighth straight game and clinching the MAC West Division title, the Huskies excelled on offense, defense, and special teams in a 59–21 victory. Llinebacker Jordan Delegal was named MAC West Division Special Teams Player of the Week. He blocked two punts as the Huskies set a school record with three blocked punts in the game.

Eastern Michigan

The Huskies had 654 yards on 46 plays, rushing for 552 yards, with most of the starters on the sideline for the second half. The Huskies swept MAC play for the first time in school history and will play Miami (8-4, 7-1) in the MAC Championship. The 71 points was the fifth most scored by the Huskies in program history. Coffman was named MAC West Division Defensive Player of the Week. He finished with five solo tackles, one sack, two tackles for loss and a forced fumble.

MAC Championship: Miami (OH)

Armand Robinson caught a 33-yard touchdown pass from Austin Boucher with 33 seconds remaining, lifting Miami to a stunning 26–21 upset of No. 25 NIU in the MAC Championship Game at Ford Field. The win marked the second time the RedHawks had won the league title game and completed a worst-to-first league finish.

Humanitarian Bowl: Fresno State

Scores by quarter

Postseason awards

Award watch lists

All-MAC

References

Northern Illinois
Northern Illinois Huskies football seasons
Famous Idaho Potato Bowl champion seasons
Northern Illinois Huskies football